Vimal Shah is a businessman, entrepreneur, mentor and industrialist in Kenya, the largest economy in the East African Community. He is the Chairman of Bidco Africa and is responsible for the company's growth into new markets and product Bidco is a business conglomerate involved in the manufacture of edible oil, detergents, soaps, margarine and baking powder. He is reported to be one of the wealthiest individuals in Kenya.

Background and education
He was born in Nyeri, Kenya. 
Vimal Shah attended the United States International University, Nairobi Campus, graduating with the degree of Bachelor of Science in Business Administration and Finance.

Work history
In 1985, the three Shahs decided to start a soap manufacturing business. When Kenyan banks denied them financing, they turned to family and friends instead. Growing cotton locally would take too much time, so they imported oil from Malaysia. Together with his father and brother, Vimal Shah built the business, growing the firm, BIDCO Africa, into one of Africa's largest companies. He rose to the position of CEO before stepping down in 2017. Since then, he has been less involved in the operational aspects of BIDCO, instead stepping up to a more strategic role as Board chairman, a position he holds to date.

BIDCO Africa is currently one of Africa's largest and fastest growing manufacturer of domestic consumer products. Currently, they market and distribute the largest and widest range of product categories in the East and Central African regions such as: Edible Oils, Cooking Fats, Margarine, Baking Products, Hygiene Products, Detergents, Laundry Bars and Animal Feeds

Wealth
In  2014, Forbes removed Vimal Shah as one of Africa's 50 richest people. Forbes Magazine, replacing Vimal Shah with his father, Bhimji Depar Shah, this replacement was due to "new information".  Forbes used their own methods to arrive at this figure, including the fact that BIDCO grossed US$500 million in sales in 2013. It has manufacturing factories in Kenya, Tanzania and Uganda. The Group's products are marketed to 13 African countries.

Business Mentorship
Starting mid-2017, Vimal Shah has been actively mentoring small and medium-sized businesses in Kenya, East Africa and continental Africa through his blog. In his blog, he talks about his life as an entrepreneur in Africa, drawing from his experience as a successful entrepreneur since 1985. Through his blog, he posts weekly on different aspects of the life of an entrepreneur. Plans are underway to expand the mentorship program beyond his blog.

Shah's mentorship program is aimed at promoting the business and innovative spirit among young people in Africa. New posts go up every Monday.

Personal life

Vimal Shah is a married to Manda Shah and is the father of one son, Soham Shah (born in 1998). He is a past Chairman of the East African Business Council, the Kenya Association of Manufacturers and the Kenya Private Sector Alliance KEPSA. In March 2014 he was elected to the 3GF (Global Green Growth Fund) based out of Amsterdam.

See also
 List of wealthiest people in Kenya
 Economy of Kenya

References

External links
   BIDCO Official Website

Living people
1959 births
Kenyan businesspeople
Kenyan people of Gujarati descent
Kenyan philanthropists
United States International University alumni
Kenyan people of Indian descent